Meadowvale Secondary School is a part of the Peel District School Board in Mississauga, Ontario, Canada.

Two feeder schools for Meadowvale Secondary School are Edenwood Middle School and Lisgar Middle School.

Extra curricular activities
Meadowvale Secondary School has many extra-curricular opportunities.

The arts program participates in two festivals: the Peel Studentwrights Drama Festival, which features student-written and student-directed works in a non-competitive festival; and the National Theatre School (NTS) DramaFest, a competitive festival. The school has won several awards in the NTS DramaFest including Outstanding Production, and Excellences in Directing, Writing and Ensemble work. Every year, the school alternates between a drama production and a musical. Musicals have included West Side Story, Footloose and Chicago.

The drama department focuses on building student leadership through directing, producing and stage managing, as well as, allows students to explore their creative voice through original student works. Students have graduated from the drama program and gone into film, TV, media related fields, broadcasting, and reporting. Maitreyi Ramakrishnan, star of Netflix's Never Have I Ever, graduated from Meadowvale.

The music program offers instrumental band, jazz band, and a vocal ensemble. Students perform twice a year in evening concerts and several times over lunch hour in Rock in the Lecture Hall events. The drama and music programs work closely together on musicals. The visual arts department runs an art club and the art department features stunning murals throughout the school.

The media department uses PCs and Macs and has a 3D printer. 

The school also offers many athletic opportunities, including Canadian football, rugby, basketball, volleyball, track and field, swimming, curling, badminton, tennis, cheerleading, and wrestling.  Meadowvale has won the junior ROPSSAA (Region of Peel Secondary Schools Athletic Association) Wrestling Championship, ROPSSAA Junior Boys Tier II Soccer, Senior Girls Tier II ROPSSAA Volleyball, Senior Girls Tier II Rugby twice and ROPSSAA Curling.

In the media 
Meadowvale Secondary School was used as the school for the 1988 B-movie The Brain, in which it was renamed "Meadowvale High School".

Between 1998 and 2000, Meadowvale Secondary School was the test site for a pilot program of the Youth News Network. Based on the American Channel One News, it saw the company Athena Educational Partners provide the school with free television sets and computers. In exchange, students would watch a daily newscast (unless they opted out), which included two and a half minutes of advertising. This provoked protest from a variety of community groups, who disagreed with the idea of showing commercials in the classroom.

Former Meadowvale Secondary School student (Rene Charlebois) and two other former students (Giuseppe (Joseph) Manchisi, Robert Grewal) were murdered in 2004. Convicted sex offender Douglas Moore was arrested and charged for their murders but while awaiting trial in prison he allegedly killed himself to avoid prosecution.

In June 2006, MSS was thrust into the international media spotlight when three of its former students, Fahim Ahmad, Saad Khalid, and Zakaria Amara were charged in an alleged terror plot. A fourth student was charged later.

IBT Program 

In 2013, Meadowvale started the IBT (International Business Technology) program. This regional program aims to enhance student's thinking and to give them a better understanding of the working world, helping them in Post-Secondary.

Notable alumni
Ed Gataveckas, Former Teacher, Former Canadian Football League linebacker with the Hamilton Tiger Cats from 1981 to 1990
Shauna Hunt, (reporter) City TV
Dusty Mancinelli, film maker, TIFF winner
Julia Porter, Actor, Stunt actor, Fight Choreographer
Wesley Morgan, Class of 2008, Actor
Chad Shaule, Class of 2008 - IBJJF Gold Medalist Pro Champion/Coach
Patrick Cederberg, Class of 2008 - Canadian Screen Award-winning Filmmaker
Waleed Ansari, Theatre and film artist, Prime's The Boys, Netflix's Umbrella Academy
Ryan Sproul, Class of 2011, NHL Professional Player - Detroit Red Wings
Elias Theodorou, Class of 2006, UFC Middleweight Fighter & The Ultimate Fighter: Nations Winner
Luke Reece, (producer, director, playwright, spoken word) Little Black Afro, Obsidian Theatre
Maitreyi Ramakrishnan, Class of 2019, Actress of Never Have I Ever
Phil Darlington, Class of 2007, (Weatherman) Global News. Formerly CTV News.
Bilal Baig, Class of 2012, Co-creator and star of Sort Of

See also
List of high schools in Ontario

References 

Peel District School Board
High schools in Mississauga
Educational institutions established in 1981
1981 establishments in Ontario